Benjamin Pennypacker House is a historic home located in West Whiteland Township, Chester County, Pennsylvania. It was built in the 1840s and is a -story, stuccoed stone dwelling with a gable roof in the rural Federal style.  It features a one-story, three-sided porch.  Also on the property is a contributing corn crib and site of a spring house.  The property was acquired by the Church Farm School about 1918, and served as the residence for the farm manager.

It was listed on the National Register of Historic Places in 1984.

References

Houses on the National Register of Historic Places in Pennsylvania
Federal architecture in Pennsylvania
Houses completed in 1849
Houses in Chester County, Pennsylvania
1849 establishments in Pennsylvania
National Register of Historic Places in Chester County, Pennsylvania